The Forgery Act 1830 (11 Geo 4 & 1 Will 4 c 66) was an Act of the Parliament of the United Kingdom. It consolidated into one Act all legislation imposing the death penalty for forgery (except for counterfeiting coins). (It did not apply to Scotland or Ireland.) Two years later the death penalty was abolished for most of these offences, and for the remaining offences in 1837.

This Act was adopted in New South Wales by section 1 of the Act 4 Will 4 No 4.

The whole Act, except for section 21, was repealed on 1 November 1861 by section 1 of, and the Schedule to, the 24 & 25 Vict c 95.

The whole Act, except section 21, was repealed as to New Zealand by section 3 of, and the First Part of the Schedule to, the Repeals Act 1878 (42 Vict No 28).

The Forgery Act 1830 was repealed for the Republic of Ireland by sections 2 and 3 and Part 4 of Schedule 2 to the Statute Law Revision Act 2007.

As to trial of offences under this Act at quarter sessions, see section 17 of the Central Criminal Court Act 1834 (4 & 5 Will 4 c 36).

Background
In 1812, William Booth was the last person to be hanged for forgery in England. A public outcry at the harshness of his sentence resulted in the death penalty in England and Wales being reserved for capital crimes, making Booth the last person in England hanged for a non-capital crime.

Section 2 - Forging the Great Seal, Privy Seal, Privy Signet, Royal Sign Manual etc, treason and capital
This section replaced the corresponding provisions in the Treason Act 1351 and the 1 Mary Stat 2 c 6. (This form of treason was reduced to felony when section 2 was replaced by the Forgery Act 1861.)

Section 21 - Rector etc not liable to any penalty for correcting, in the mode prescribed, accidental errors in the register
This section read:

Nothing contained in the Act 24 & 25 Vict c 95 in any manner altered or affected any power or authority given by this section to alter or amend any register of births, baptisms, marriages, deaths or burials.

The words "and be it enacted" were repealed by section 1 of, and the Schedule to, the Statute Law Revision (No. 2) Act 1888 (51 & 52 Vict c 57).

This section was repealed by section 26(2) of, and Schedule 4 to, the Parochial Registers and Records Measure 1978 (No 2). It is replaced by section 4 of that Measure.

See also
Forgery Act
Peel's Acts

References
The Statutes of the United Kingdom of Great Britain and Ireland, 11 Geo. IV. & 1 Will. IV. 1830. King's Printer. London. 1830. Pages 403 to 418.
Hansard
The Law of Forgery; including the alterations effected by the late Act 1. Will. 4. c. 66. together with the Act, and Explanatory Notes, Forms of Indictments, and the Evidence in support of each Indictment. J & W T Clarke. Portugal Street, Lincoln's Inn, London. 1831.  Google Books. Said to be by John Frederick Archbold: catalogues:  New York City Bar Association; J & W T Clarke, pp 2, 3, 47 & 105.
"The Forgery Act, 1830". Halsbury's Statutes of England. First Edition. Butterworth & Co (Publishers) Ltd. Bell Yard, Temple Bar, London. 1930. Volume 15. Page 699.
William Newland Welsby and Edward Beavan. Chitty's Collection of Statutes. Second Edition. S Sweet. London. Hodges and Smith. Dublin. 1851. Volume 2. Title "Criminal Law". Subtitle "Forgery and False Personation". Pages 225 to 238.
"Forgery Act 1830". The Statutes Revised, Northern Ireland. Second Edition. 1982. Volume A. Page 487.
Thomas Walter Williams. "Forgeries". An Accurate Abstract of the Public General Statutes passed in 11 George IV. & 1 William IV. Printed for George Wightman. Paternoster Row. London. 1830. Pages 239 to 259.
John Collyer. "Forgery". The Criminal Statutes of England. Printed for S Sweet. London. Printed for W Wrightson, Birmingham. 1832. At pages 142 to 162, 166 to 169, 205, 206, and 221m to 221o.
William Evans, Anthony Hammond and Thomas Colpitts Granger. A Collection of Statutes Connected with the General Administration of the Law. Third Edition. Thomas Blenkarn. Edward Lumley. W H Bond. London.1836. Volume 10. A Supplement to the Collection of Statutes Connected with the General Administration of the Law. Part 5. Pages 816 to 828.
Archibald John Stephens. The Statutes Relating to the Ecclesiastical and Eleemosynary Institutions of England, Wales, Ireland, India, and the Colonies. John W Parker. West Strand, London. Volume 2. Pages 1436 to 1438.
John Jervis and William Newland  Welsby. Archbold's Pleading, Evidence and Practice in Criminal Cases. Twelfth Edition. London. 1853. Pages 441 to 446, 457 to 459, 468 to 474, 477 to 479, 490, 762 and passim.
Thomas Chitty. The Justice of the Peace and Parish Officer. S Sweet. A Maxwell. London. 1831. Volume 2. Pages 828 to 840.
Joseph Chitty and John Walter Hume. "Of the Forgery of Bills, Notes, and Checks, and Offences of that Nature". A Practical Treatise on Bills of Exchange, Checks on Bankers, Promissory Notes, Bankers' Cash Notes and Bank Notes. Tenth American Edition from the Ninth London Edition. By O L Barbour. G & C Merriam. Springfield. 1842. Part 3. Chapter 1. Page *764 et seq. Twelfth American Edition from the Ninth London Edition. By J C Perkins. 1854. Part 3. Chapter 1. Page 844 et seq.
Ratcliffe Pring. Statutes in Force in Colony of Queensland, to the Present Time. Brisbane. 1862. Volume 1. Pages 293 to 297.
Alexander Oliver. A Collection of the Statutes of Practical Utility, Colonial and Imperial, in Force in New South Wales. Thomas Richards, Government Printer. Sydney. 1879. Volume 1. Pages 408 to 422.
Henry Cary. A Collection of Statutes affecting New South Wales. Sands and Kenny. Sydney. Sands, Kenny & Co. Melbourne. 1861. Volume 1. Pages 309 to 323.
Travers Adamson. Acts and Ordinances in Force in Victoria. John Ferres, Government Printer. Melbourne. 1855. Volume 1. Pages 428 to 432.
The Law Relating to India, and the East-India Company. Second Edition. Wm H Allen & Co. London. 1841. Pages 349 to 351.
"Criminal Law Report" (1835) 13 The Law Magazine 1 at 9

External links
The Forgery Act 1830, as enacted, from Google books.
List of repeals and amendments in the Republic of Ireland from the Irish Statute Book

United Kingdom Acts of Parliament 1830
Forgery